Ernest Gardner may refer to:

 Ernest Gardner (politician) (1846–1925), British politician
 Ernest Gardner (art historian) (1878–1972), English writer, art historian and photographer with a particular focus on medieval sculpture and architecture.
 Ernest Arthur Gardner (1862–1939), English archaeologist and director of the British School at Athens between 1887 and 1895.